Tangy Fruits were small edible fruit flavoured round candies, often sold in New Zealand at cinemas.

They were served in pottles, which typically weigh 160 grams. The unique packaging of Tangy Fruits was considered perfect for cinemas, as there was no disturbing rustling when one reached for a second helping. In addition, they rolled well down the aisles and were perfect for throwing/biffing.

Tangy Fruits were made by confectioner Cadbury, which owns the Pascall brand distributing the candy. Production ceased in 2008, due to a lack of consumer demand.

References

Discontinued products
New Zealand confectionery
Pascall (company) brands
Mondelez International brands